Aleksandra Kaczyńska (born 2 December 1954) is a Polish rower. She competed at the 1976 Summer Olympics and the 1980 Summer Olympics.

References

External links
 
 

1954 births
Living people
Polish female rowers
Olympic rowers of Poland
Rowers at the 1976 Summer Olympics
Rowers at the 1980 Summer Olympics
Sportspeople from Wrocław